Harika is a female given name of Arabic origin, meaning wonderful, excellent or beautiful. It is used in Turkey, and also in India.

References

Turkish feminine given names